The Strandzha Commune or Strandzha Republic was a short-lived anarchist commune. It was proclaimed during the Preobrazhenie Uprising in 1903 by Internal Macedonian Adrianople Revolutionary Organization rebels in Strandzha, in the Adrianople Vilayet of the Ottoman Empire.

History
By 1903, the anarchist Mihail Gerdzhikov was elected as a commander of the Internal Macedonian Revolutionary Organisation's armed guerrilla wing in Thrace, the so-called Mortal Combat Body  which helped stage a revolt against the Ottomans in Adrianople Vilayet. In the Ilinden–Preobrazhenie Uprising Gerdzhikov's forces about 2,000 strong, facing a Turkish garrison of 10,000 well-armed troops, managed to establish a liberated zone in the Strandzha Mountains, centered in  Vasiliko. This successful mass uprising, supported by militia, allowed the rebels to capture most of East Thrace, settling in Malko Tarnovo. The new "Strandzha Commune" was established and maintained for almost a month. In the region, under the influence of the anarcho-communist views of Gerdzhikov and the leadership of the Odrinsk revolutionary district, a new communal management system was established where all issues were resolved by mutual agreements between the Bulgarians and Greeks.

The economy of the Strandzha Commune was based on anarcho-communist principles. Most of the labor force was composed of women, who worked in the farms as men became guerilla fighters. The Turkish government was surprised by the uprising, taking extraordinary military measures to suppress it. The Ottomans managed to destroy the Strandzha Republic, committing atrocities against the rebel forces and the local population. As a result of the suppression, about 30,000 refugees took refuge in Bulgaria.

See also
 Kruševo Republic
 Petrova Niva

References

Bibliography
 
 .
  .

Further reading

Conflicts in 1903
States and territories established in 1903
Anarchist intentional communities
Anarchism in Bulgaria
Anarchism in Turkey
Former countries in Europe
20th-century revolutions
Internal Macedonian Revolutionary Organization
Adrianople vilayet
Ottoman Thrace
History of Burgas Province
Former socialist republics